Musikot is a municipality and the district headquarter of Western Rukum District in Karnali Province of Nepal that was established as Musikot Khalanga on 2 December 2014 by merging the two former Village development committees Musikot and Khalanga. From 2014 until 2018, Musikot was called Musikot Khalanga and until 2017 served as the district headquarter of Rukum District. It lies on the bank of Sani Bheri River. It borders with Eastern Rukum in the east, Sanibheri rural municipality in the west, Banfikot rural municipality in the north and Tribeni rural municipality and Rolpa district in the south. 

Once a red fort of CPN (Maoist Centre), Musikot is now ruled by Nepali Congress since the year 2022 and Maoists have finally lost both mayoral and deputy mayoral post.

Demographics
At the time of the 2011 Nepal census, 98.9% of the population in Musikot Municipality spoke Nepali, 0.5% Kham and 0.4% Magar as their first language; 0.1% spoke other languages.

In terms of ethnicity/caste, 57.8% were Chhetri, 18.4% Magar, 10.9% Kami, 3.9% Damai/Dholi, 3.0% Thakuri, 2.9% Hill Brahmin, 1.7% Sarki, 0.3% Sanyasi/Dasnami, 0.3% Badi and 0.8% others.

In terms of religion, 98.4% were Hindu, 1.3% Christian, 0.1% Buddhist, 0.1% Muslim and 0.1% Prakriti.

Media 
To Promote local culture Musikot has one FM radio station, Radio Sani Bheri F.M. - 89.2 MHz, which is a Community radio Station.

Transportation  
Rukum Salle Airport lies in Old-Musikot offering flights to Nepalgunj and Kathmandu.
Rapti Highway links Musikot to the Terai region of Nepal.

References

External links
 Official website

Populated places in Western Rukum District
Municipalities in Karnali Province
Nepal municipalities established in 2014